Saco River may refer to:

Saco River, a river in northeastern New Hampshire and southwestern Maine in the United States
East Branch Saco River, a 13.2-mile-long (21.3 km) river in the White Mountains of New Hampshire, a tributary of the Saco River
East Fork East Branch Saco River, a 2.2-mile-long (3.6 km) tributary of the East Branch of the Saco River
Little Saco River, a 4.5-mile-long (7.2 km) tributary of the Saco River in western Maine
Old Course Saco River, a 21.9-mile-long (35.2 km) river in western Maine, the route of the Saco River until the early 1800s
Saco River (Maranhão), a river of Maranhão state in northeastern Brazil
Saco River (Paracauari), a river in the state of Pará, Brazil, a left tributary of the Paracauari River
Do Saco River (Rio de Janeiro), a river of Rio de Janeiro state in southeastern Brazil